The Indian Posse (IP) is an indigenous street gang set in Western Canada based in Winnipeg, Manitoba. It is one of the largest street gangs in Canada.

Criminal Intelligence Service Canada (CISC) has designated the IP as being a member of indigenous-based organized crime (IBOC), along with Redd Alert and the Manitoba Warriors. CISC asserts that the Indian Posse, in addition to engaging in marijuana cultivation, auto theft, illegal firearms activities, gambling, and drug trafficking, also supports and facilitates criminal activities for the Hells Angels motorcycle gang and Asian-based networks.

The Wolfe brothers
The gang was founded in the summer of 1988 in Winnipeg as a street gang by the Wolfe brothers, Danny and Richard. Richard Daniel Wolfe was born in 1975 and Daniel Richard Wolfe was born in 1976. The Wolfe brothers were Cree, but spoke English as their first language though Danny Wolfe as an adult expressed the wish to learn the Cree language. The father of the Wolfe brothers, Richard Wolfe Sr, was an alcoholic while their mother, Susan Creeley, was a drug addict and an alcoholic who by her own admission failed dismally at being a mother. As a father, Richard Wolfe Sr, was only irregularly involved in raising his sons, and was last seen by them in 1988. Creely's father was the chief of the Okanese First Nation reservation in Saskatchewan and he was a highly respected World War II veteran. But his life fell apart due to his alcoholism, and he regularly beat his wife and children. Creeley attended a residential school from the age of 6 onward and was raped by her teacher, causing her to engage in heavy drinking from the age of 12 onward. In an interview, Creeley defined her mothering as: "I just went to the party and got drunk. I didn't give a shit. I did that because I didn't have any love in my heart and I didn't have parenting skills. I lost that in the residential schools". In sentencing Richard Wolfe in 2016, the judge stated: "He was raised in an environment where substance abuse and domestic violence was prevalent. Richard was repeatedly exposed to violence which occurred during his parents' house parties. He was sexually abused at the age of seven, once by a stranger and twice by a neighbour. The episodes of sexual abuse left Richard confused, ashamed and full of hate".

Creeley lived on welfare, but spent so much money on alcohol and drugs that her sons were usually hungry. To feed themselves, the Wolfe brothers started stealing, smashing the windows of cars to steal whatever money happened to be in the car in order to buy food, leading to frequent arrests. By the age of 10, Danny Wolfe was already an accomplished shop-lifter and stole his first automobile. The Wolfe brothers grew up in the "howling chaos of the North End" of Winnipeg where the people live in a Third World level of poverty and where arson, shootings, heavy drinking on the streets, prostitution and drug abuse were daily occurrences. The journalist Jon Friesen wrote about the Wolfe brothers: "By the time they were about ten or eleven years old, Danny and Richard were quite accustomed to raising themselves. They had no regard for conventional rules or morality. They saw themselves as survivors and were prepared to do whatever it took to make it".  Creeley, who stopped her substance abuse and drinking in 2001, believes that if she had been a better mother, her sons might have chosen a different path, and now works as an youth counselor, trying to save troubled First Nations young people from the fate of her sons.

The Wolfe brothers were greatly influenced by American gangsta rap, which was their favorite genre of music, and much of the style of the gang owned considerably more to Afro-American gangsta rappers than to First Nations culture. The word Indian was often used in a pejorative sense in Manitoba, and the Wolfe brothers picked the name Indian Posse as an attempt to cancel out the negative sense of the word Indian, just in the same way that some Afro-Americans call themselves “niggas” in an attempt to turn a derogatory word into an affirmative one. The symbol of the gang was and still is a red bandanna. The red bandanna is a symbol of the group's Red Power politics, symbolizes blood and passion, and because the gang believes that red is the color of power. The group was only open to indigenous people and was led by a "circle" (council) of ten. Officially, all decisions had to reached unanimously by the circle in a nod to the traditional collective leadership of the Cree whose ruling "circles" required unanimity, but in reality the Wolfe brothers dominated the circle. A sense of First Nations identity outweighed any of the traditional divisions and Cree, Ojibwa and Métis were all well represented in the Indian Posse. Within a year of its founding, the gang had hundreds of members and primarily engaged in theft. Initially the gang had both male and female members, but in 1990 the rules were changed to make the gang into an all-male group, ostensibly to protect the female members from violence . The cardinal rules of the Indian Posses are that its members were forbidden to take "hard drugs" such as cocaine and heroin; are never to speak to outsiders about the gang's activities: and that new members had to endure "minutes of pain" where they be beaten by other members for at least five minutes to test their toughness while those wishing to leave had also endure the "minutes of pain", but only for much longer.

Richard Wolfe started carrying a handgun to school at the age of 13, and after his gun was discovered by a teacher, resulted in his first criminal conviction on 2 February 1989. By 1990, the Indian Posse moved into automobile theft and armed robbery. By 1991, the teenage Wolfe brothers had moved into drug dealing and prostitution and by 1992 had rented a house for $866 rent per month. In 1991, the Indian Posse had established an open air drug market outside of the Merchant's Hotel, known locally as "the Merch", on Selkirk Avenue in the North End of Winnipeg. The drug market outside of "the Merch" became one of the largest emporiums for buying drugs in Winnipeg. The Lord Selkirk Park Housing Development, whose inhabitants were almost entirely First Nations or Métis people, had become the stronghold of the Indian Posse, whose members sold cocaine, LSD, heroin, and marijuana. The Third World poverty of the North End of Winnipeg made joining the gang attractive to many young people. Richard Wolfe was considered to be the "diplomat" who was calm and able to think in the long term while Danny Wolfe was the "warrior" who was a hot-head who thought only in the short term. On 1 June 1993, the Indian Posse was mentioned for the first time by the Winnipeg Free Press, who described the Indian Posse as the gang that caused much crime in the North End.

Expansion
On the night of 9 February 1994, a rival gang called the Overlords fired a shotgun at an Indian Posse house, leading to a drive-by shooting in retaliation a few hours later that left a woman wounded. As the first drive-by shooting in Winnipeg the incident attracted much media attention. Drive-by shootings are the favorite means of the Indian Posse to eliminate rivals, which in turn reflects the influence of black street gangs in Los Angeles, whom the Indian Posse model themselves after. The clothing style of the Indian Posse was a carbon-copy of Afro-American street gangs as the Indian Posse's preferred dress were and are baggy jeans, baseball hats, and track suits. The hand gestures which carry symbolic meanings used by the Indian Posse are copies of those used by black street gangs in Los Angeles. Danny Wolfe's favorite rapper was Tupac Shakur and the CDs of his music were one of his treasured possessions. Monster: The Autobiography of an L.A. Gang Member, the 1993 autobiography of Sanyika Shakur, a member of the Los Angeles gang, the Crips, has been described by the police as the "bible" of the Indian Posse, being virtually the only book that Indian Posse members all read, and which is constantly found whenever they raid the homes of Indian Posse members.

In September 1994, the Winnipeg police announced that they were targeting the Indian Posse, whom they blamed for much of the crime in the North End. In response, Richard Wolfe gave an interview with the journalist Paul Wiecek of the Winnipeg Free Press which gave the gang a high profile in Winnipeg and beyond. Richard Wolfe claimed the Indian Posse was a Red Power group committed to defending First Nations people from a racist society. The Indian Posse uses slogans such as "Red Till Dead" and "Fuck Canada, this land is our people". In 1994, the Indian Posse had made contracts with criminal elements in reservations in North Dakota and South Dakota in an attempt to set up a cross-border smuggling network. The Wolfe brothers also frequently visited British Columbia to set up a drug-smuggling network with the Vancouver underworld. Despite their claim to be protecting First Nations people, the IP engaged in sexual slavery, forcing girls as young as 10 to work as prostitutes.

By 1994, at the age of 19, Richard Wolfe was making between $15,000 to $30,000 a week, giving him an annual income of about $1 million Canadian dollars. However, the Wolfe brothers, like other Indian Posse members, were better at spending money than earning it. Sergeant Mike MacKinnon of Winnipeg police department stated: "There's no discipline to save cash and accrue assets. No education to rely on for cash management. You might pull them over and they'll have $10,000 or $15,000 on them, but at the end of the day that's money already spent... We haven't seen anyone moving up into buying large condos or anything like that. They still live in the neighborhoods they always lived in". Most of the Indian Posse members come from broken homes, which was a disadvantage as Richard Wolfe conceded in a 2011 interview: "The smart guy can be a tough guy when the time comes, but not vice versa. The smart guys usually stay out of gangs, though." In a letter to his brother in 2000, Danny Wolfe put it more earthly that the Indian Posse's principal problem was "too many fucked-up people recruiting fucked-up people."

On 14 May 1995, Richard Wolfe shot a pizza delivery man, Maciej Slawik, and was convicted of attempted murder on 31 May 1996. The owner of the pizzeria Jumbo Pizza owed the Wolfe brothers $60,000 in a drug debt and Richard Wolfe expected the money in cash in the pizza box when he ordered a pizza. To send a message to the pizzeria's owner, he impulsively decided to kill the pizza delivery man, saying in 2011: "I lost my cool. There were lots of people mad at me for that". The fact that Slawik was a Polish immigrant who had nothing to do with crime was not relevant to Wolfe who blasted him with a shotgun. After Richard Wolfe was charged with attempted murder, Danny Wolfe threatened to kill two witnesses if they testified against his brother, leading for him to be convicted of obstructing justice and uttering death threats in September 1995.

On 25 April 1996, a riot broke out at Headingley Correctional Institution between the imprisoned Indian Posse members versus the imprisoned members of the rival Manitoba Warriors, which brought the gang national attention for the first time. The riot, which put Headingley into a 18-hour lockdown, caused $8 million in damage while leaving eight guards seriously injured, four of whom had their fingers chopped off after taken prisoner. Much of the rivalry between the Indian Posse and the Manitoba Warriors concerns their attitude towards the Hells Angels. The Warriors have long purchased their drugs from the Hells Angels while the Indian Posse takes a more anti-Angel position. Richard Wolfe stated about his brother's attitude towards outlaw bikers: "Danny always hated bikers". By 1996, the Indian Posse had expanded into Saskatchewan, mostly because of the practice of the federal government of sending convicted Indian Posse members to prisons in Saskatchewan. In contrast to the Indian Posse, which began as a street gang, through it has been active in prisons since the 1990s, the Manitoba Warriors were founded as a prison gang in 1993, and which has since become active on the streets. The Manitoba Warriors and the spin-off group, the Alberta Warriors, reflecting their origins in the prisons tended to be more organized than the Indian Posse and to have stronger ties to other organized crime groups such as the Hell Angels. The rival Redd Alert gang were founded in Alberta's prisons by First Nations prisoners who did not want to be forced to join either the Indian Posse or the Warriors.

As the feud between the Warriors and the Posse caused a spiraling murder rate among First Nations young men in western Canada, Phil Fontaine, the National Chief of the Assembly of First Nations, attempted to mediate a truce in January 1997 between the two gangs. While serving a prison sentence in 2003 and 2004, Danny Wolfe befriended Gerry Matticks, the imprisoned boss of the Irish-Canadian West End Gang of Montreal. As Matticks is illiterate, Wolfe read and wrote letters for him. As the West End Gang control the port of Montreal, where most of the illegal drugs in Canada are imported, the alliance with the West End Gang became a profitable one for the Indian Posse. The Hells Angels approached Wolfe with an offer while he was in prison to become the exclusive wholesalers to the IP, selling them drugs while the IP would continue to serve as street dealers. Wolfe rejected the offer, saying the Indian Posse should be treated as equal to the Angels, not subordinates. In a phone call that was recorded by prison officials, Wolfe was heard to say: "We just told them [the Hells Angels], 'Hey man, we won't fucking stand in front, we won't stand behind you'. We're going to stand side by side if we do this... They wanted control. We just said 'No'. And ever since then, we had to back them off". The Indian Posse has since emerged as one of the Hells Angels' major rivals in western Canada.

In the summer of 2002, there had been a number of violent incidents at Stoney Mountain Penitentiary between the imprisoned members of the Hells Angels' puppet gang, the Zig Zag Crew, and the Indian Posse. A Zig Zag Crew member threw an Indian Posse member down a flight of stairs, leading to an Indian Posse member to stab and seriously wound a Zig Zag Crew member. In September 2002, the Indian Posse tried to assassinate Maurice Boucher of the Hells Angels by firing a bazooka at his prison cell. The journalists William Marsden and Julian Sher wrote that the Indian Posse had the "prison network and the bravado" to try to assassinate Boucher. The Indian Posse has a violent rivalry with the white supremacist gang, the White Boy Posse, which serves as a puppet gang for the Hells Angels in Alberta. In 2004, the Indian Posse were brought to further national attention by the documentary Stryker which chronicled a 13-year First Nations boy in Winnipeg working as an arsonist for the Indian Posse.

The Indian Posse has created a female auxiliary, the Indian Posse Girls, which has taken control of the prostitution rackets in Edmonton and Hobbema. The Canadian criminologist Mark Totten wrote that many of the teenagers who work for the Indian Posse are sometimes pressured into joining, giving the case of a 12-year girl known as Susan whose father was Cree while her mother was white. The exterior of the house where Susan lived in was spry-painted in red paint with insulting statements such as "Skank lives here" and "Susan is a slut!". Totten interviewed her, and she stated in her interview that she started selling drugs for the Indian Posse following the spray-painting of her mother's house, saying she had been given an ultimatum of either start selling drugs or be gang-raped. Totten interviewed another former Indian Posse member, a 24-year-old man named Charlie who at the time of the interview was homeless and dying of AIDS, which he contracted via the shared use of needles to inject drugs while he was in prison. In his interview, Charlie stated that he was placed in care while he was 10, which caused him to try to escape numerous times. When he was 11 years old, he finally escaped and ended up living homeless in Winnipeg. To support himself, Charlie started to steal and after his release from one of his prison terms, he joined the Indian Posse when he met several gang members whom he had known while he was in prison. Charlie stated that he wanted to sell cocaine and methamphetamine for the Indian Posse because it would allow him to make enough income to afford an apartment. Charlie endured the "minutes of pain", which allowed him to enter the gang; when he asked about going to hospital given his injuries caused by the beating, he was told to snort cocaine instead to deal with the pain. Totten wrote that young men such as Charlie were very typical of the Indian Posse members.

In 2005, the Criminal Intelligence Service Canada reported that the Indian Posse had moved into Edmonton and Fort McMurray, where it was active selling drugs. The same report stated the Indian Posse was also active in the Grande Prairie and Peace River Country regions of Alberta. The Indian Posse is very active in Yellowknife.

In May 2006, an Indian Posse leader, Sheldon McKay, was strangled to death in his prison cell at the Stony Mountain prison by four other members led by Danny Wolfe. Residents of the Samson Cree Nation reservation in Alberta blamed the Indian Posse for a drive-by shooting in April 2008 that left an innocent by-stander, the toddler Asia Saddleback, wounded when she was hit by a spray bullet. A gang member, Christopher Crane, shot up the Saddleback house because he believed it was the home of a rival gang member. In 2010, the Royal Canadian Mounted Police (RCMP) reported that the Indian Posse had moved into northern Ontario, the rural areas in the interior of British Columbia and the Far North of Canada. In 2017, an IP member in Saskatoon, Kyle Landon Neapetung, was convicted of torturing with a blowtorch another man, Brenden Peters, for five days in March 2016. In 2018, an IP member, Elwood Terry Poorman, was charged with a murder in Port Coquitlam, suggesting that the Indian Posse had reached the Lower Mainland of British Columbia.

Brad Peequaquat, a member of the Saskatchewan's Yellow Quill First Nation, was recruited into an Indian Posse chapter with his brother Sherman, remembering: "They seemed to be young guys just like us. I just thought it'd be fun. We all joined.... They promised us this fast, easy life, but it wasn't. They were living off of us, and we were getting sick of everything." Sherman Peequaquat recalled that joining the IP: "The violence escalated, the stabbings and everything." MacKinnon dismissed the claim that the Indian Posse is defending and protecting First Nations people, saying: "If you look at the victims of their homicides, the girls they force into prostitution and the people they sell drugs to, they're victimizing their own people. There is nothing cultural about the Indian Posse. The only cultural thing is a gang subculture."

The end of the Wolfe brothers
On 20 September 2007, Danny Wolfe was involved in a verbal dispute in a bar in Fort Qu'Appelle with Bernard Percy Pascal, a member of the rival Native Syndicate. Later the same night, Wolfe broke into Pascal's house and started shooting everybody he saw. He killed Michael Itittakoose and Marvin Arnault while wounding Pascal, Jesse Obey and Cordell Keepness. Friesen describe Wolfe's shooting rampage as motivated by his ego as he could not stand any personal slights, real or imagined, and after Pascal insulted him in the bar felt that only swift and blinding violence could avenge the blow to his ego.

While in jail awaiting his trial, Wolfe broke out from the Regina Correctional Centre on 24 August 2008 and was arrested three weeks later in Winnipeg. The manhunt for Danny Wolfe across the Prairies, who was described by the police as highly dangerous, attracted much media attention. During his three weeks of freedom, Wolfe returned to Winnipeg, where he engaged in much womanizing and substance abuse until in order to collect a reward an anonymous caller gave his location away to the police. In November 2009, Danny Wolfe was convicted of two counts of murder and three counts of attempted murder, being sentenced to 25 years in imprisonment.

Both the Wolfe brothers died in prison. While serving his life sentence in the Saskatchewan Penitentiary, Danny Wolfe was murdered by another prisoner on 4 January 2010. Richard Wolfe was convicted of attempting to murder a pizza delivery man in 1996, but was released on parole in 2010. Wolfe vowed to "go straight", but in 2013, he broke up with his girlfriend and started to abuse alcohol and drugs again. In November 2013, to prevent him from returning  to prison, a couple gave him a home in their basement and attempted to help him turn his life around. On the night of 6 April 2014, Wolfe raped the woman and then attacked the man with a baseball bat after the man heard his wife screaming. For this violation of his parole, Wolfe was sent back to prison where he died in 2016. In March 2015, he pleaded  guilty to one count of rape and one count of assault with a deadly weapon. Owing to the dangers of attacks from rival gang members and for being a rapist, Wolfe was held in solitary confinement, causing him to suffer from severe depression, which contributed to his death from a heart-attack at the age of 40 on 27 May 2016.

References

Books and articles

External links
Danny Wolfe and the Indian Posse
The Sentencing Decision with Richard Wolfe 8 January 2016
Review of The Ballad of Danny Wolfe: Life of a Modern Outlaw

Organizations established in 1988
1988 establishments in Manitoba
Street gangs
Indigenous gangs
Gangs in Manitoba